is a museum of decorated kofun in Yamaga, Kumamoto Prefecture, Japan. The collection includes full-size replicas of the inner chambers of twelve tumuli.

The museum was designed by Tadao Ando and completed at a cost of ¥1.6 bn in April 1992.

See also
 Kofun period
 Kumamoto Prefectural Museum of Art

References

External links
  Kumamoto Prefectural Ancient Burial Mound Museum
  Decorated Kofun Database

Archaeological museums in Japan
Prefectural museums
Museums in Kumamoto Prefecture
Tadao Ando buildings
Kofun
Museums established in 1992
1992 establishments in Japan